Yuri Ustimenko (born April 23, 1981) and Dmitry Medvedev (May 1981 – May 5, 2002) were Russian serial killers operating in Estonia. They secretly arrived in Estonia over the Narva Reservoir in the autumn of 2001, after deserting a submarine school in St. Petersburg.

Both men murdered five people, but two of their victims managed to escape. Medvedev was killed by Latvian police in a firefight, but Ustimenko managed to escape. He was eventually captured in Poland for illegal border crossing and later identified by Interpol. He was extradited to Estonia, where he was sentenced to life imprisonment.

Crimes 
On March 18, 2002
, at 4:24, a bomb exploded at the main door of a gun shop at Roosikrantsi 8 in Tallinn. After four minutes, another bomb blew up. The explosions injured two people, who were hit by glass. Witnesses saw two men running away from the event. Emergency workers who arrived at the site discovered a third, undetonated bomb, which was safely disposed of. Bomb defusal center manager Arno Pugonen thought that the bombs were meant to attack the Jagdwelt hunting supply store. Made by Predator was found written in black marker on the bomb. Subsequent to the arsenal of weapons taken from the store, five people were assassinated. A few weeks later a taxi driver was attacked in Tartu, and three days after the attack, a taxi driver was killed in Tallinn. On March 31, the perpetrators entered a shop in Tartu and killed the 51-year-old saleswoman there. On April 11, the murderers struck again, but this time it was a 22-year-old saleswoman in a mall, whom survived. The police felt that the murders were merciless, as the first shot was usually shot in the wall or ceiling, while in these the sellers were immediately shot at. The police found a muffler with a stick made of sandwich paper, which had Made by Predator written on it. Forensic investigators found that a similar letter had been found at the Roosikrantsi explosion site and reported it to the Central Criminal Police, realising they were dealing with serial killers.

On April 24, money brokers were attacked in Sillamäe. The criminals shot a 23-year-old man and severely injured a 36-year-old babysitter, who was driven to the hospital and saved by the doctors. At the beginning of May, the people hiding behind the pseudonym Predator were discovered - Russian citizens Yuri Ustimenko and Dmitry Medvedev. Before police could send their pictures to the media, the criminals killed a 24-year-old salesman from Küti Business and took cartridges from the store. The Central Criminal Police received information that the murderers planned to move to Latvia and warned Latvian colleagues.

Medvedev's death and Ustimenko's capture 
Valka authorities noticed two men who corresponded to the description given by their Estonian colleagues, and decided to check them. The police asked to see their documents, and the men did not react to it. When a policeman asked them to lie down, they began to run away and the policemen chased after them. One of the officers, Aigars Kurpnieks, was shot in the stomach, making his fellow officer Eriks Zanders and security guard Sandris Jacino come to his aid. They both called in for their colleagues to come help, with policemen rushing to the scene. At the same time, Zanders managed to kill Medvedev. When Ustimenko saw that his partner-in-crime gunned down, he ran away with police on his tail, but managed to escape.

After this, Ustimenko was declared internationally wanted. He was eventually captured at the
Suwałki Bus Station on May 8. The Polish court accused him of illegally crossing the border and possessing a weapon. Poland then decided to extradite him to Estonia. On November 13, K-Commandos brought Ustimenko to a Polish airline in Ukraine. In Estonia, the court sentenced him to life imprisonment and, when the Supreme Court did accept the complaint, the sentence was upheld. Early release from prison can be applied for Ustimenko in 2032, when he has been imprisoned for 30 years. In 2010, he presented a letter of condolences to the President, which was rejected.

Chronology 

 On March 18, at 4:25, Ustimenko and Medvedev bombed the Roosikrantsi 8 gun shop, stealing a shotgun.
 On March 29, a 45-year-old taxi driver was shot in Tallinn. 200 kroons and an old cellphone were stolen.
 On March 31, a 51-year-old saleswoman named Galina was shot in Tartu. One thousand kroons were looted from the store.
 Early April, 20-year-old Vassili Zudin was killed and buried in the forest near Sillamäe.
 On April 8, 20-year-old Valentin Oleinikov, an associate of Ustimenko and Medvedev, was killed and buried near Jõelähtme.
 On April 11, a 22-year-old saleswoman named Reelika was injured in the center of Tartu. An employee from a neighbouring shop was able to call an ambulance, saving her. 700 kroons and a phone were stolen from the store.
 On April 24, a 23-year-old man was shot dead in Sillamäe. A 36-year-old babysitter was also shot in the head, but managed to survive. Supposedly 50,000 kroons were taken away.
 On May 3, in Tallinn, a 25-year-old gun shop owner named Indrek was killed. Cartridges were also stolen from his store.
 On May 5, a firefight broke loose in Valka, Latvia. Patrol officer Aigars Kurpnieks was injured by Medvedev and later perished from his injuries. His fellow officer, Ēriks Zanders, managed to gun down Medvedev, while Ustimenko disappeared into the night after the death of his friend. The Central Criminal Police believed that Ustimenko could return to Estonia, and therefore focused on the fact that he could be hiding in Ida-Viru County. At the same time, he was also actively being sought after by the Latvian police.
 On May 7, Ustimenko secretly crossed the border between Lithuania and Poland. Local residents informed border guards that a suspicious man had been seen sitting in a bus in Sejny.
 On May 8, the man, identifying himself as Ilia Habarov, was arrested at the  Suwałki Bus Station. His real identity was revealed thanks for the photo circulated through Interpol.

See also
List of serial killers by country

References

External links 
 "Serial killer Ustimenko regrets nothing" Postimees, October 10, 2011

1981 births
2002 crimes in Estonia
2002 in Estonia
2002 murders in Europe
2000s murders in Estonia
Bombers (people)
Criminal duos
Fugitives
Fugitives wanted by Estonia
Living people
Male serial killers
Murder in Estonia
People convicted of murder by Estonia
Russian serial killers
Russian spree killers